Wisconsin has a long history with the Boy Scout and Girl Scout organizations from the 1910s to the present day, both programs have independently served thousands of youth in programs that suit the environment in which they live.

Early history (1910–1950)
In 1920, the Appleton Council, and the Neenah-Menasha Council were both formed. They merged to become the Valley Council (#635) in 1922. In 1924 Valley Council changed its name to the Fox River Valley Council (#635), changing it back to Valley in 1925. In 1920, the Fond Du Lac Council (#622) was founded, changing its name to the Badger Council (#622) in 1926. In 1919, the Manitowoc Council (#625) was formed, changing its name to the Manitowoc County Council (#625)  in 1929, changing its name to the Waumegasako Council (#625) in 1940. The Waumegasako Council merged into the Bay-Lakes Council (#635) in 1973. In 1920, the Green Bay Council was founded, closing in 1922. In 1930, the Green Bay Area Council was founded again, changing its name to the Nicollet Area Council (#621) in 1934. In 1919, the Oshkosh Council (#630) was founded, changing its name to the Twin Lakes Council (#630) in 1935. In 1919, the Sheboygan County Council (#632) was founded, changing its name to the Kettle Moraine Council (#632) in 1935.

The Oconomowoc Council was formed in 1917. It disbanded in 1921. The Janesville Council was formed in 1917. It disbanded in 1917. The Sturgeon Bay Council was formed in 1918. It disbanded in 1919. The Ashland Council was formed in 1918. It disbanded in 1920.

Ma-Ka-Ja-Wan Scout Reservation is a Boy Scouts of America property and High Adventure base located in Northern Wisconsin and serves the Scouts of the Northeast Illinois Council based in Highland Park, Illinois. Originally a logging camp, the Scouts purchased the land and first had campers in 1929.

Recent history (1950–present)
The Bay-Lakes Council (#635) was formed in 1973 by a merger of the following councils: Badger (based in Fond du Lac), Waumegesako (based in Manitowoc), Nicolet Area (based in Green Bay), Valley (based in Menasha), Twin Lakes (based in Oshkosh), and Kettle Moraine (based in Sheboygan). The Hiawathaland Council joined in 2012.

Boy Scouts of America in Wisconsin today

There are seven Boy Scouts of America local councils headquartered in Wisconsin.  Additionally, some adjacent councils in Illinois and Minnesota serve portions of Wisconsin.  Besides these councils, some out of state councils maintain camp facilities in Wisconsin.

Bay-Lakes Council

The Bay-Lakes Council is headquartered in Appleton, Wisconsin, and also serves Scouts in Michigan. Bay-Lakes Council #635 was formed on July 1, 1973, and is geographically one of the largest Boy Scout councils in the United States.

Bay-Lakes Council was formed in 1973 by a merger of the following councils: Badger (based in Fond du Lac), Waumegesako (based in Manitowoc), Nicolet Area (based in Green Bay), Valley (based in Menasha), Twin Lakes (based in Oshkosh), and Kettle Moraine (based in Sheboygan). The Hiawathaland Council joined in 2012.

Blackhawk Area Council

Blackhawk Area Council is headquartered in Rockford, Illinois and serves southwestern Wisconsin and northwestern Illinois.

Chippewa Valley Council

The Chippewa Valley Council is headquartered in Eau Claire.

History
In 1922, the Watertown Council was formed, disbanding in 1925. In 1927, the Chippewa Falls Council was formed, disbanding in 1928. In 1927, the Eau Claire Council (#621) was formed, changing its name to the Chippewa and Eau Claire Counties Council (#621), changing its name to the Ojibwa Council (#621) in 1925. Ojibwa became the Chippewa Valley Council (#637) in 1928.

Organization
 Blue Hills
 Clear Water
 Glaciers End
 Tall Oaks

Camps
 L.E. Phillips Scout Reservation (Rice Lake)

Order of the Arrow
 Otyokwa Lodge #337

Gateway Area Council

The Gateway Area Council, headquartered in La Crosse, serves Scouts in Wisconsin and Minnesota.

History
In 1917, the Lacrosse Council (#624) was formed, changing its name to the Gateway Area Council in 1925.

Organization
 Seven Rivers- Houston County (MN), School District of La Crosse, Onalaska, Prairie du Chien, Stoddard
 The Great Soaring Eagle- Buffalo & Trempealeau Counties, School District of Holmen
 Winding Trails- Jackson, Monroe, Juneau, Vernon, Crawford Counties, School District of West Salem, Bangor

Camps
The camp is easily accessible with its main entrance on Council Bay Road, seven miles north of Holmen, WI, and four miles southeast of Galesville, WI.
 Hoffman Park provides rustic adventures near Black River Falls, WI.

Order of the Arrow
 Ni-Sanak-Tani Lodge #381

Glacier's Edge Council

The Glacier's Edge Council provides Scouting services to communities in the counties of Adams, Columbia, Dane, Dodge, Grant, Green, Iowa, Jefferson, Lafayette, Richland, Sauk, Rock, Walworth in Wisconsin as well as Winnebago and Boone counties in Illinois. It is composed of representatives of more than 250 community organizations holding charters to operate a program of the Boy Scouts of America. The council meets annually in May to elect officers and board members. It was organized in 2005 growing from a consolidation of the Four Lakes and Sinnissippi Councils and granted a charter by the Boy Scouts of America.

History
The Janesville Council was formed in 1917. It disbanded in 1917. In 1919, the Madison Council (#628) was formed, changing its name to the Four Lakes Council (#628) in 1929. In 2005, Four Lakes changed its name to Glacier's Edge Council (#628). In 1920, the Beloit Council (#620) was formed, changing its name to the Beloit Area Council (#620) in 1928. In 1925, the McHenry County Council (#695) (Illinois) was formed, merging into the Beloit Area Council (#620) in 1928. In 1920, the Beloit Area Council (#620) changed its name to the State Line Council (#620) in 1936. In 1928, the Indian Trails Council (#633) was formed. State Line and Indian Trails merged to become the Sinnissippi Council (#626) in 1966. Sinnissippi "consolidated" with Four Lakes Council of Madison to become Glacier's Edge Council  (#628) in 2005.

Organization
Districts:
 Indian Trails
 Mohawk
 Wisconsin River
 Yahara

Camps
Camps:
 Ed Bryant Scout Reservation on the Castle Rock Flowage near Mauston
 Camp Indian Trails on the Rock River near Janesville (Sold in 2021 to Rock County)

Order of the Arrow
 Bigfoot Lodge (Chartered 5/5/2018 - formerly Takoda Lodge 2006–2018)

Northern Star Council

Indianhead Council merged with Viking Council in 2005 to create Northern Star Council. The Indianhead Council was headquartered in Saint Paul, Minnesota, and including Ramsey and Washington Counties in Minnesota, and much of western Wisconsin. Its name came from the shape of the Wisconsin-Minnesota border, which is said to resemble that of the head of an Indian. As well as the office building in Saint Paul, facilities included Tomahawk Scout Reservation near Rice Lake, Wisconsin, Phillippo Scout Reservation near Cannon Falls, Minnesota, Fred C. Andersen Scout Camp near Hudson, Wisconsin, and Kiwanis Scout Camp near Marine on St. Croix, Minnesota.

Potawatomi Area Council

The Potawatomi Area Council is headquartered in Waukesha, Wisconsin. The Potawatomi Area Council serves all of Waukesha County and portions of Dodge, Jefferson, Walworth and Washington Counties. The Wag-O-Shag Lodge is the Order of the Arrow lodge. Potawatomi Area Council has one summer camp named Camp Long Lake.

The Potawatomi Area Council (#651) was formed in 1931.

Samoset Council

Samoset Council is headquartered in Weston (near Wausau), and serves the north central part of Wisconsin and was founded in 1920. It gets its name from an early Boy Scout camp in the town of Harrison, named Camp Sam-O-Set which closed in 1934, a year before the construction of Camp Tesomas.

In 1919, the Oneida County Council was formed, changing its name to the Rhinelander Council in 1922. In 1928, Rhinelander merged into Marathon and Lincoln Counties Council (#627) in 1928. In 1921, the Merrill Council (#627) was formed, merging into the Marathon and Lincoln Counties Council (#627) in 1926. In 1921, the Wausau Council (#644) was formed, merging into the Marathon and Lincoln Counties Council (#627) in 1926.

In 1917 the Wisconsin Rapids Council was formed, changing its name to Wood County in 1925. In 1921, the Stevens Point Council (#633) was formed, merging into the Wood County Council (#636) in 1927. The Wood County Council (#636) merged into the Central Wisconsin Council (#636) in 1929. Central Wisconsin merged into Samoset Council (#627) in 1937. In 1921, the Marinette Council (#626) was formed, merging into the Marathon and Lincoln Counties Council (#627) in 1930. In 1930, Marathon and Lincoln Counties changed its name to Samoset.

Three Harbors Council

In 1915, the Milwaukee Council (#629) was formed, changing its name to the Milwaukee County Council (#629) in 1929. In 1917, the Racine Council (#631) was formed, changing its name to the Racine County Council (#631) in 1927. In 1917, the Kenosha Council (#623) was formed, changing its name to the Kenosha County Council (#623) in 1929. In 1961, the counciol changed its name to Kenosha Council (#623). In 1972, Kenosha Council and Racine County Council merged to become the Southeast Wisconsin Council (#634).

In September 2011, Southeast Wisconsin Council and Milwaukee County Council merged to form Three Harbors Council.

Organization
Districts:
 Aurora (Northern Milwaukee County, Wauwatosa, and West Allis)
 Southern Shores (Southern Milwaukee County)
 Red Arrow (Racine and Kenosha Counties)

Order of the Arrow
The Kanwa tho Lodge #636 is the Order of the Arrow lodge for Three Harbors Council. It was founded on January 6, 2013, through the consolidation of Mascoutens Lodge #8 and Mikano Lodge #231. The name and totem were chosen by the youth of the new lodge on the morning of July 8, 2012. Kanwa tho Lodge's totem is a panther, and "Kanwa tho" translates to "panther band".

Voyageurs Area Council

The Ashland Council was formed in 1918. It disbanded in 1920. Headquartered in Hermantown, Minnesota, Voyageurs Area Council serves Scouts in Minnesota, Wisconsin, and Michigan. Its Order of the Arrow Lodge is Ka'niss Ma'ingan Lodge #196.

Girl Scouts of the USA

There are three Girl Scout councils serving Washington.

There are four councils of the Girl Scouts of the USA headquartered in Wisconsin. Additionally, two adjacent councils in Minnesota serve portions of Wisconsin.

Badgerland Council

Badgerland Council serves more than 14,200 girls and has some 4,500 adult volunteers in south-central and south-western Wisconsin. It was formed in June 2009 by the merge of three councils and part of a fourth: Girl Scouts of Badger Council, Girl Scouts of Black Hawk Council, Girl Scouts of Riverland Council, and the Wisconsin part of Girl Scouts of Green Hills Council.

Services centers Beloit, Madison, La Crosse, and Platteville

Camps
 Camp Brandenberg is located northwest of Madison, and is available for use year-round.
 Camp Black Hawk is located near Antigo, Wisconsin and is a summer resident camp.
 Camp Ehawee is located near La Crosse, and is a summer resident camp.
 Stetler is a camping area east of Madison, available for use year-round.

Manitou Council

Manitou Council serves 7,500 girls in Calumet, Dodge, Fond du Lac, Manitowoc, Ozaukee, Sheboygan, and Washington counties in Wisconsin.

It was slated to be merged with several other councils into Girl Scouts of the Northwestern Great Lakes. In December 2008, the 7th Circuit Court of Appeals gave a preliminary injunction enjoining the national organization from changing the status of Manitou Council.

Headquarters Sheboygan, Wisconsin

Camps
Camp Evelyn is 240 acres near Plymouth, Wisconsin. 
Camp Manitou is 140 acres near Shoto, Wisconsin.

Girl Scouts of Minnesota and Wisconsin Lakes and Pines

This council was formed on January 1, 2008, from the merger of Girl Scouts – Land of Lakes Council, Girl Scouts – Northern Pine Council and a portion of the Peacepipe and the Pine to Prairie Councils. Only one of this council's camps is located in Wisconsin.

Girl Scouts of Minnesota and Wisconsin River Valleys

Girl Scouts of Minnesota and Wisconsin River Valleys serves 32,000 girls and 11,000 volunteers in southern Minnesota and western Wisconsin. It was created in 2007 as the result of a merger of five Minnesota councils. Only one of its camps is located in Wisconsin.

Girl Scouts of the Northwestern Great Lakes

In partnership with over 6,000 adult volunteers, Girl Scouts of the Northwestern Great Lakes (GSNWGL) serves nearly 15,000 girls in 58 counties in northern Wisconsin and Michigan's Upper Peninsula. The council's jurisdiction spans about 400 miles from east to west and about 300 miles from north to south.

It was formed on May 1, 2008, by the merger of Girl Scouts of Birch Trails Council, Girl Scouts of the Fox River Area, Girl Scouts of Indian Waters, Girl Scouts of Lac Baie Council, Girl Scouts of Peninsula Waters and Girl Scouts of Woodland Council.

Headquarters Appleton, Wisconsin

Camps
Camp Birch Trails, the council's largest camp, is located near Merrill, Wisconsin.
Camp Nesbit is located in Sidnaw, Michigan.
Camp Winnecomac is located in Kaukauna, WI.
Camp Sacajawea is located on the outskirts of Wisconsin Rapids, WI. 
Camp Nawakwa is located in Cornell, WI.
Camp Del O'Claire is located near Wausau, WI. As of November 2015, it is being investigated to decide whether it should remain open.
Camp Cuesta is located near Baileys Harbor, WI.

Girl Scouts of Wisconsin Southeast

Girl Scouts of Wisconsin Southeast (GSWISE) serves some 33,000 girls in Kenosha, Milwaukee, Racine, Washington and Waukesha, as well as the southern part of Ozaukee and eastern parts of Dodge and Jefferson counties.

Headquarters Milwaukee, Wisconsin

Camps and centers
 Alice Chester Center, East Troy
 Camp Pottawatomie Hills, East Troy
 Camp Winding River, Neosho
 Chinook Program Center & Activity Station, Waukesha
 Girl Scout Service Center, Racine
 Marion Chester Read Center, Milwaukee
 Silverbrook Program Center, West Bend
 Trefoil Oaks Program Center, Kenosha
 Volunteer Center/Council Office, Waukesha
 Woodhaven, Kenosha

See also

 Madison Scouts Drum and Bugle Corps
 Racine Scouts Drum and Bugle Corps
 Boy Scout Lane

References

External links

 Camp Ma-Ka-Ja-Wan Unofficial Camp Site

Youth organizations based in Wisconsin
Wisconsin
Central Region (Boy Scouts of America)